Eschatotypa is a genus of moths belonging to the family Tineidae.

Species
Eschatotypa derogatella (Walker, 1863)
Eschatotypa halosparta (Meyrick, 1919)
Eschatotypa melichrysa Meyrick, 1880

References

Tineidae
Endemic fauna of New Zealand
Taxa named by Edward Meyrick
Tineidae genera
Endemic moths of New Zealand